Leo Oswald Lucchini (August 12, 1927 – August 4, 1991) was a Canadian ice hockey player with the Edmonton Mercurys. He won a gold medal at the 1950 World Ice Hockey Championships in London, England. The 1950 Edmonton Mercurys team was inducted to the Alberta Sports Hall of Fame in 2011. He also played with the San Francisco Shamrocks, New Westminster Royals, Rossland Warriors and Vernon Canadians.

His grandson Jake Lucchini is a professional player in the Ottawa Senators organization.

References

1927 births
1991 deaths
Canadian ice hockey left wingers
Ice hockey people from Alberta